Artyom Andreyevich Timofeyev (born 12 January 1994) is a Russian football player who plays as a defensive midfielder for Akhmat Grozny.

Club career
Timofeyev made his debut in the Russian Professional Football League for FC Spartak-2 Moscow on 30 July 2013 in a game against FC Vityaz Podolsk.

Timofeyev made his first-team debut for FC Spartak Moscow on 22 August 2013 as a starter in the Europa League qualifying game against FC St. Gallen.

Timofeyev made his Russian Premier League debut for FC Spartak Moscow on 15 March 2015 in a game against FC Dynamo Moscow. He scored his first league goal for Spartak on 7 October 2018, an added-time winner in a 3–2 defeat of FC Yenisey Krasnoyarsk.

On 13 January 2019, Timofeyev joined Krylia Sovetov Samara on loan until the end of the 2018–19 season. On 27 June 2019, Timofeyev rejoined Krylia Sovetov on another season-long loan.

On 6 August 2020, Timofeyev joined Akhmat Grozny on a season-long loan deal for the 2020–21 season.

On 31 July 2021, he returned to Akhmat on a permanent basis and signed a 3-year contract.

Career statistics

Club

References

1994 births
Sportspeople from Saratov
Living people
Russian footballers
Association football midfielders
Russia youth international footballers
Russia under-21 international footballers
FC Spartak Moscow players
PFC Krylia Sovetov Samara players
FC Akhmat Grozny players
Russian Premier League players
FC Spartak-2 Moscow players